The Russian Winter Meeting is an annual indoor track and field competition which is held at the Kutz Arena within the CSKA Universal Sports Hall in Moscow, Russia, every February. The event is part of the annual IAAF Indoor Permit Meeting series.

The meeting came into being in 1992, following the dissolution of the Soviet Union, and it was the first athletics event to be held by the newly created governing body for the sport – the All-Russia Athletic Federation. Three world indoor records were broken at the first event and the history of the competition has featured numerous world, continental and national records since then.

The competition regularly attracts the foremost Russian track and field athletes. It began to take on an increasingly significant international dimension from 2000 onwards – the meeting had competitors from nine countries in 2003 but by the 2011 edition it featured athletes from twenty-five countries.

The programme of events in Moscow is often experimental as it regularly contains running events over unconventional distances, such as 300 m, 600 m and 1000 m races.

Meet records

Men

Women

References

External links
Official site at Russian Athletics
Russian Winter Meeting Records. Rus Athletics. Retrieved on 2011-02-12.

IAAF Indoor Permit Meetings
Athletics competitions in Russia
Sports competitions in Moscow
Winter events in Russia
Athletics in Moscow

